The 1st Lo Nuestro Awards ceremony, presented by Univision honoring the best Latin music of 1988 and 1989 took place on May 31, 1989 at the Knight Center, in Miami, Florida, United States. The ceremony was broadcast in the United States and Latin America by Univision.

During the ceremony, nineteen categories were presented. Winners were announced at the live event and included Mexican band Los Bukis and Puerto-Rican singer Lalo Rodríguez receiving three awards each. Spanish performer Isabel Pantoja earned two accolades, including Pop Album of the Year. Mexican singer-songwriter Marco Antonio Solís was named Producer of the Year, while Roberto Livi and Alberto Campoy won for Composer of the Year for the track "Toco Madera" performed by Spanish singer Raphael.

Background 
In 1989, the Lo Nuestro Awards were established by Univision, to recognize the most talented performers of Latin music. Joaquín Blaya, President of Univision, named the awards the "Hispanic Grammys", since the Lo Nuestro would be the first Spanish-language music awards shows that does not reveal winners before the broadcast of the show. "The time has come for us to legitimize an award that recognizes Hispanic talent, and we wanted to do it by the same standard that the (English language) industry is measured," Blaya added. The nominees and winners were selected by a voting poll conducted among program directors of Spanish-language radio stations in the United States and also based on chart performance on Billboard Latin music charts, with the results being tabulated and certified by the accounting firm Deloitte. The award included a trophy shaped like a treble clef. The categories were for the Pop, Tropical/Salsa, and Regional Mexican genres, with additional awards for Producer, Composer and Crossover Artist of the Year, respectively. The 1st Lo Nuestro Awards ceremony was held on May 31, 1989 at the Knight Center, in Miami, Florida, United States. The ceremony was broadcast in the United States and Latin America by Univision with an estimated audience of 200 million viewers in 16 countries.

Winners and nominees 

Winners were announced before the live audience during the ceremony. Mexican band Los Bukis dominated the Regional/Mexican field winning for Group, Song ("Y Ahora Te Vas") and Album of the Year (Si Me Recuerdas). The album was nominated for a Grammy Award for Best Mexican/Mexican-American Album. Three awards were also received by Puerto-Rican Lalo Rodríguez, including Tropical/Salsa Artist, Album (Un Nuevo Despertar) and Song of the Year for his top ten single "Ven, Devórame Otra Vez". Mexican singer Yuri was awarded for Pop Song of the Year for "Qué Te Pasa", a track that spent 16 weeks at number-one in the Billboard Top Latin Songs chart. Desde Andalucía by Spanish singer Isabel Pantoja won for Pop Album of the Year and reached number-one in the Billboard Latin Pop Albums chart.

Presenters

Source:

Performers

Source:

See also
1988 in Latin music
1989 in Latin music
Grammy Award for Best Latin Pop Album

Notes

References

1989 music awards
Lo Nuestro Awards by year
1989 in Florida
1989 in Latin music
1980s in Miami